Ulmus ismaelis is a small tree discovered circa 1997 in southern Mexico by Ismael Calzada in riparian forest along the Mixteco River system in northeastern Oaxaca, where it grows among large boulders in the limestone canyons. The tree has since been found in Honduras and El Salvador. The tree is exceptional in its habitat: dry places, sometimes with <500 mm per annum precipitation, and comparatively low altitudes of 450–750 m.

Description
Rarely growing to > 15 m in height, typically < 10 m with a trunk diameter of 30 cm; the tree has exfoliating orangish bark. The ovate leaves are coriaceous, < 9.6 cm in length by 4.6 cm broad, acute at the apex, pinnately veined, on short (2–5 mm) petioles; the colour ranges from dull green to light brown. The apetalous flowers are arranged as short racemes on leafless twigs, sparsely clustered on < 7 mm peduncles. The samarae are < 22 × 13 mm, tapering at the base to a <8 mm stalk, with ciliate margins, and are shed during June and July in Mexico; in Honduras and El Salvador the tree flowers at the time of foliage change, just before the fall of the leaves of the previous season during the months of February and March, and fructifies from March to the end of April, coinciding with the emergence of the new season's leaves.

Pests and diseases
No information available.

Cultivation
The tree is extremely rare in cultivation; it was introduced to Europe in 2019 as seed sent to the Grange Farm Arboretum, Lincolnshire, UK. Seedlings were later disseminated by the arboretum to Butterfly Conservation's main trials site, Great Fontley, Hampshire, UK, and the Escuela Tecnica Superior de Ingenieros de Montes, Universidad Politecnica de Madrid, Spain.

Etymology
The species is named for the Mexican botanist and collector Dr Juan Ismael Calzada, who discovered the tree.

Accessions

Europe
 Grange Farm Arboretum, Lincs., UK. Seedlings germinated 2019.
 Butterfly Conservation elm trials plantation, Great Fontley, Hants., UK. One seedling, germinated 2019.

References

Elm species and varieties
Endemic flora of Mexico
Trees of Mexico
Trees of Oaxaca
Trees of El Salvador
Trees of Honduras
Trees of Central America
Ulmus articles missing images
ismaelis